The North Monastery (Irish: An Mhainistir Thuaidh), commonly known as The Mon, is a co-educational education campus comprising Scoil Mhuire Fatima Primary School, North Monastery Co-educational Secondary and Gaelcholáiste Mhuire AG located at Our Lady's Mount, Cork, Ireland.

History
The North Monastery was founded on 9 November 1811 when Brother Jerome O'Connor and Brother John Baptist Leonard were given charge of a school in Chapel Lane by the Bishop of Cork, Rev Dr Moylan. Seventeen students attended on the first day. In 1814, a 14-acre sloping site was acquired from a wealthy Catholic businessman, Sir George Goold, Baronet, and a new school was built. The North Monastery had found its permanent home. An outbreak of typhus fever in the city in 1816 saw the school being used as a temporary hospital.

Brother Griffin, a poet and novelist, became a member of the North Monastery in 1839. He died on 12 June 1840 in his 37th year. His remains are interred in the cemetery in the grounds of the school. It was shortly after the death of Griffin that Daniel O'Connell visited with the Founder of the Order, Edmund Ignatius Rice.

In 1857, Brother James Burke arrived at the North Monastery and under his guidance the students began the study of natural philosophy (science). 
At this time John Philip Holland (inventor of the submarine) studied under the guidance of Br. Burke.
In 1879, Patrick J. Kennedy, a past pupil, was installed as Lord Mayor of Cork, the first of a long and distinguished list of past pupils to hold this office. In 1901 the Lord Mayor of Cork, Edward Fitzgerald, organised an Industrial Exhibition.

The school represented the Department of Education and Br. Burke and his students built an electric tramway which was the high point of the exhibition. Burke died on 23 March 1904 as the result of an accident and was accorded a public funeral with a procession through the streets of Cork city. He was buried in the cemetery at the North Monastery.

In 1911, the school celebrated its centenary and the Br. Burke Memorial Extension, was formally opened in 1913. On the advent of the First World War the British army confiscated lathes, drilling machines and other machinery from the school. They closed and sealed the wireless room and cut down the aerial mast. These precautions were carried out under the Defence of the Realm Act.

In March 1920, Lord Mayor Tomás Mac Curtain, a past pupil, paid an official visit to the school and addressed the boys in Irish. Shortly afterwards he was murdered at midnight by a gang of armed assassins. He was given a public funeral at which nearly 2,000 North Monastery boys marched in procession. Terence McSwiney, who was also a past pupil, was his successor. He died in October 1920 in Brixton prison after 74 days on hunger strike.

The school continued to flourish and produced many more past pupils who distinguished themselves in all walks of life including business, politics, sport, the arts and academia, including former Taoiseach and  sportsman Jack Lynch who formally opened a new secondary school building in 1967.

Notable former pupils

Academic 
 Tadhg Begley, Professor at Cornell and Texas A & M universities 
 Patrick F. Fottrell, Professor and President at NUI Galway
 Vincent Barry, credited with the development of the compound used to cure leprosy.

Arts 
 Jonathan Rhys Meyers, actor 
 Edward Mulhare, actor
 Niall Tobin, actor
 Frank O'Connor, short story writer
 Joe Lynch, actor
 Donal Farmer, actor
 Rory Gallagher, blues rock guitarist
 Matt Cooper, journalist and radio presenter
 Seán Ó Ríordáin, poet

Politicians 
 Jack Lynch, Taoiseach and Cork hurler
 Tomás Mac Curtain, Lord Mayor of Cork
 Terence McSwiney, Lord Mayor of Cork
 Donal O'Callaghan, Lord Mayor of Cork

Sport 
 Johnny Clifford, hurler
 Paddy Collins, hurler
 Con Murphy, hurler
 Mick Kennefick, hurler
 John Buckley, hurler
 Dónal O'Grady, hurler
 Tomás Mulcahy, hurler and footballer
 Tony O'Sullivan, hurler and footballer
 Kieran McGuckin, hurler
 Teddy McCarthy, hurler and footballer
 Seán Óg Ó hAilpín, hurler
 Setanta Ó hAilpín, hurler
 Aisake Ó hAilpín, hurler
 Patrick Horgan, hurler
 Mark Carroll, Olympic athlete
 Ciaran Teehan , Darts
 Doney Walsh, Cross Country Runner

Notable former teachers
 John Philip Holland, inventor of the submarine
 Dónal O'Grady, former hurler and manager

References

External links
Primary School Official Site
Secondary School Official Site
Gaelscoil website

 
Secondary schools in County Cork
Boys' schools in the Republic of Ireland
1811 establishments in Ireland
Educational institutions established in 1811